Jawahar LPS Kurakkodu is a lower primary School in Kerala, India. Jawahar LPS Kurakkodu was established as a Malayalam school in June 1976. The first Headmistress  of the School was Mrs. G.Thilaka Teacher.

The school started with 60 students and 5 staff. It is situated in a  plot in a quiet and serene atmosphere with a nice hill view. The admissions have been open to all without discrimination of religion, caste status in society.

Location 
Jawahar LPS Kurakkodu is a lower primary School in Kollam (Old Name-Quilon) District, Taluk - Kottarakkara, Village - Chithara, Bock- Chadayamangalam and in Chithara Panchayathu. The nearest Town is Madathara. Post office is Kollayil.

Coordinates 8°48'3"N   76°59'25"E

Pre-primary education 
Kurakkodu is a small agricultural village located in Kollam District, Kerala, just 12 kilometers away from the MC road. The village is known for its spice and rice production. .

Library 
JLPS kurakkodu has a collection of children's books.

DPEP program
A centrally sponsored scheme, DPEP is a program seeking to reconstruct primary education as a whole in selected educationally backward districts. Its emphasis is on decentralized planning and management as well as community participation. The program was introduced in the Jawahar LPS in December 1994.the SSA programme and other works of teacher  are developed by the school now 250 students and 12 teachers in this school

The Midday Meal scheme 

Midday Meal Scheme is the name for the school meal program in Kerala. From the very first day of school, Jawahar LPS kurakkodu provides a midday meal to school-children on all working days. The key objectives of the Midday Meal Program are protecting children from classroom hunger, increasing school enrolment and attendance, and improved socialization among children belonging to all castes, and addressing malnutrition.

External links
  Wikimapia link

Monuments and memorials to Jawaharlal Nehru
Schools in Kollam district
Educational institutions established in 1976
1976 establishments in Kerala